Anaxidia lozogramma is a moth of the family Limacodidae found in Australia, in coastal and subcoastal areas from the Atherton tableland to Eungella in northern Queensland and from southern Queensland to Mount Keira in New South Wales.

The larvae feed on the foliage of Macadamia, Dodonaea triquetra and Camellia.

External links
Anaxidia lozogramma at CSIRO Entomology
Image

Limacodidae
Moths described in 1902
Moths of Australia